The Rheinhöhenweg Trail is a popular hiking trail on the mountains of the
Rhine Valley. It leads from the Lower Rhine in Bonn passing the Loreley up to the Upper Rhine. There is a Rheinhöhenweg Trail on both sides of the Rhine River. On the left side it goes from Bonn to Alsheim, which is to the south of Mainz, with a total length of 240 km. On the right side it goes from Bonn-Beuel to Wiesbaden with a total length of 272 km. Both trails together have a combined length of over 500 km. The Rheinhöhenweg Trail is marked by a black R on a white background. The trails on the left and on the right side are frequently connected by hiking trails called "Rheinhöhen Connection Trails", marked by the sign "RV".

The Rheinhöhenweg Trail passes a vast number of famous castles like the Godesburg, Lahneck Castle, Stolzenfels Castle, Castle Rheineck, Rheinstein Castle, Drachenburg Palace and many others.

External links 

 Rheinhöhenweg trail
  Rheinhöhenweg
  Rheinhöhenweg on the left side

Hiking trails in Rhineland-Palatinate
Hiking trails in North Rhine-Westphalia
Hiking trails in Hesse